Michael Russell won the first edition of this tournament, after he beat Alex Kuznetsov in the final 6–4, 7–6(6).

Seeds

Draw

Final four

Top half

Bottom half

References
 Main draw
 Qualifying draw

2009 ATP Challenger Tour
2009 Singles